Mahatma Gandhi College, Lakshadweep, is a general degree college located in Andrott, Lakshadweep. It was established in 1983. The college is affiliated with Calicut University. This college offers different courses in arts, commerce and science.

Accreditation
The college is  recognized by the University Grants Commission (UGC).

References

External links

Universities and colleges in Lakshadweep
Colleges affiliated with the University of Calicut
Educational institutions established in 1983